Jacques Palzer (21 April 1900 – 13 December 1979) was a Luxembourgian gymnast. He competed in nine events at the 1924 Summer Olympics.

References

External links
 

1900 births
1979 deaths
Luxembourgian male artistic gymnasts
Olympic gymnasts of Luxembourg
Gymnasts at the 1924 Summer Olympics
Sportspeople from Esch-sur-Alzette
20th-century Luxembourgian people